Miodrag "Dragi" Stamenković (29 February 1920, in Leskovac – 17 February 2004, in Belgrade) was a Yugoslav and Serbian politician and author.

Biography 
He finished his elementary school and two grades of the gymnasium in his home town, while in Belgrade he graduated from the Trading school. In his early years, he was a member of the United Trade Unions. He served as the leader of the Communist Youth in Serbia during the World War II and after the war, he worked for the communist government in Serbia and in 1951 he became president of the League of Trade Unions of Yugoslavia as well as the vice president of the Central Council of the League of Trade Unions. In 1964 he was appointed as the President of the People's Government of Serbia and he served that role until 1967. He was the Yugoslav ambassador to the United Kingdom between 1974 and 1977.

He died on 17 February 2004 in Belgrade and was buried in the New Cemetery.

References

1920 births
2004 deaths
Serbian politicians
Prime Ministers of Serbia
20th-century Serbian people
Yugoslav politicians
Recipients of the Order of the People's Hero